Riama raneyi is a species of lizard in the family Gymnophthalmidae. The species is endemic to Ecuador.

Etymology
The specific name, raneyi, is in honor of Richard H. Raney, mayor of Lawrence, Kansas (1967–1968), for his support of the University of Kansas Natural History Museum.

Geographic range

Reproduction
R. raneyi is oviparous.

References

Further reading
Doan TM, Castoe TA (2005). "Phylogenetic taxonomy of the Cercosaurini (Squamata: Gymnophthalmidae), with new genera for species of Neusticurus and Proctoporus ". Zoological Journal of the Linnean Society 143: 405–416.
Doan TM, Schargel WE (2003). "Bridging the Gap in Proctoporus Distribution: a New Species (Squamata: Gymnophthalmidae) from the Andes of Venezuela". Herpetologica 59 (1): 68–75. (Riama raneyi, new combination).
Kizirian DA (1996). "A review of Ecuadorian Proctoporus (Squamata: Gymnophthalmidae) with descriptions of nine new species". Herpetological Monographs 10: 85–155. (Proctoporus raneyi, new species).

Riama
Reptiles of Ecuador
Endemic fauna of Ecuador
Reptiles described in 1996
Taxa named by David A. Kizirian